is a Japanese company headquartered in Tokyo, Japan, that offers IT services.

Overview
Originally, in 1991, 3Com Japan Corp. was established by Mitsui & Co. and 3Com Corp.
.
In 1994, 3Com Japan Corp. was renamed to Next Com Corp.. In 2007, Next Com Corp. acquired Mitsui Knowledge Development Corp., that was also established by Mitsui & Co. in 1967, then the company was renamed to Mitsui Knowledge Industry Co., Ltd.
.

The company offers the services of system integration, cloud computing, information security, and IT lifecycle support in Japan and mostly for enterprises. The business type and scope is same as Itochu Techno-Solutions, SCSK and Uniadex, these are also the companies in Japan and mostly for enterprises. 

The company was listed on JASDAQ Securities Exchange (2665.TYO) on September, 2000, then Tokyo Stock Exchange 2nd Section on April, 2004.
On January, 2015, The company became the wholly owned subsidiary of Mitsui & Co. by takeover, and was delisted on Tokyo Stock Exchange.

See also
 List of companies of Japan

References

External links
 Official website

Cloud computing providers 
Computer security companies 
Information technology consulting firms of Japan
Service companies based in Tokyo 
Mitsui
 
1991 establishments in Japan